The Church of St Giles is a  Grade I listed church in Totternhoe, Bedfordshire, England. It became a listed building on 3 February 1967. The church was built using stone from local quarries and has a fine exterior. "Flint-flushwork" decoration is used in the gable of the nave. Building began in the 14th century and was not completed until the 16th.

See also
Grade I listed buildings in Bedfordshire

References

Church of England church buildings in Bedfordshire
Grade I listed churches in Bedfordshire